Finn Harry Gundersen (16 April 1933 – 30 July 2014) was a Norwegian ice hockey player and football player, born in Oslo, Norway.

Ice hockey career
He played for the Norway men's national ice hockey team, and  participated at the Winter Olympics in 1952, where the Norwegian team placed 9th. He was also Norwegian Champions in ice hockey in 1959 with Tigrene.

Football career
He played football for Skeid where he won the Norwegian Football Cup in 1954, 1955 and 1956. An attacking midfielder, he played professional football for Hellas Verona in Italy in 1957–58, and represented the Norway national football team ten times scoring two goals.

International goals
''Norway score listed first, score column indicates score after each Gundersen goal.

References

External links

1933 births
2014 deaths
Ice hockey players at the 1952 Winter Olympics
Norwegian footballers
Association football midfielders
Norway international footballers
Skeid Fotball players
Norwegian ice hockey players
Olympic ice hockey players of Norway
Ice hockey people from Oslo
Norwegian expatriate footballers
Norwegian expatriate sportspeople in Italy
Expatriate footballers in Italy